Ruth S. DeFries (born October 20, 1956) is an environmental geographer who specializes in the use of remote sensing to study Earth's habitability under the influence of human activities, such as deforestation, that influence regulating biophysical and biogeochemical processes. She was one of 24 recipients of the 2007 MacArthur Fellowship, and was elected to the United States National Academy of Sciences in 2006.

Life
DeFries received her Ph.D. in 1980 from the Department of Geography and Environmental Engineering at Johns Hopkins University and her B.A. in Earth Science in 1976 from Washington University in St. Louis. In April 2016, Columbia University named her a University Professor, its highest academic rank. She had previously been the Denning Family Professor of Sustainable Development in Columbia's Department of Ecology, Evolution, and Environmental Biology. Before moving to Columbia in 2008, she was a professor at the University of Maryland, College Park with joint appointments in the Department of Geography and the Earth System Science Interdisciplinary Center.

An Ecomodernist Manifesto
In April 2015, DeFries joined with a group of scholars in issuing An Ecomodernist Manifesto. The other authors were: John Asafu-Adjaye, Linus Blomqvist, Stewart Brand, Barry Brook, Erle Ellis, Christopher Foreman, David Keith, Martin Lewis, Mark Lynas, Ted Nordhaus, Roger A. Pielke, Jr., Rachel Pritzker, Joyashree Roy, Mark Sagoff, Michael Shellenberger, Robert Stone, and Peter Teague

Works

Books 
 The Big Ratchet: How Humanity Thrives in the Face of Natural Crisis (2014) Basic Books

Scientific papers 
DeFries is the author or co-author of over 100 scientific papers on such topics as: impacts of tropical fires on air quality and greenhouse gas emissions; land use, nutrition, and food security; land use and conservation in the tropics; climate and tropical agriculture; processes of tropical deforestation and degradation; methods for remote sensing of land cover; and reviews and conceptual papers.

Awards
 2007 MacArthur Fellows Program
 2015 Breakthrough Paradigm Award
 2017 Honorary Doctorate (Faculty of Science, Katholieke Universiteit Leuven (Belgium))

References

http://www.ruthdefries.e3b.columbia.edu/

External links
Homepage at University of Maryland

1957 births
Living people
American geographers
MacArthur Fellows
Johns Hopkins University alumni
University of Maryland, College Park faculty
University of Maryland College of Behavioral and Social Sciences people
Columbia University faculty
Members of the United States National Academy of Sciences
American women academics
Women geographers
Fellows of the Ecological Society of America
21st-century American women
Washington University in St. Louis alumni